The Munising Rear Range Light works with the Munising Front Range Light to project a line of light out into Lake Superior in order to guide boats from the open lake into the safe harbor at Munising, Michigan. This harbor is a natural bay (thus providing protection from easterly or westerly storms) and sheltered on the north by Grand Island.  Grand Island however provides a serious navigation hazard, and as boats navigate in the East Channel, there are several dangerous rock ledges that will sink the unwary captain. This pair of range lights replaced the ineffective Grand Island East Channel Light in 1905. The history of these lighthouses is documented by Terry Pepper and is not reproduced here.

The light is located on the hill south of the village of Munising. It contains an incandescent electric light inside a red shield.

References

External links

Lighthouses completed in 1905
Lighthouses in Alger County, Michigan
1905 establishments in Michigan